Nicolas-Marie Ozanne (12 January 1728 – 5 January 1811) was a naval engineer and marine artist, author of a naval treatise and creator of a series of 60 views of the ports of France. His work witnesses to the French Navy of his time, particularly the Ponant (western) fleet.

Life
Ozanne was born in Brest, France. His drawing skills were recognised at a very early age and aged only 10 he was given a place in the studio of Robelin, a drawing master in the gardes de la marine, becoming his assistant in 1742. There he was talent-spotted by Bigot de la Mothe, who had him draw plans for coastal gun batteries.

He was only 16 when his father died. Nicolas-Marie then took on his brothers and sisters to his care as engravers to give them a livelihood; his sister Marie-Élisabeth also took up pastels. He was then spotted by Duhamel du Monceau, who recommended him to Antoine Louis Rouillé – Ozanne then illustrated several works by Duhamel, with whom he was friends.

In 1750, Nicolas Ozanne succeeded Robelin as professor of drawing. In 1751, Rouillé employed him to produce ship designs then engravings of  Louis XIV's trip to Havre in 1749. He was admitted as an assistant-member of the Académie de Marine and in 1757 made a naval artist at the Palace of Versailles. In 1762 he was given a role in the military geographers' department and at this time was also put in charge of educating the Dauphin's children in naval matters, contributing to the future Louis XVI's interest in the sea. In 1766, he designed the yacht Aurore for a scientific expedition led by Courtanvaux.

Ozanne retired in 1791, living in poverty until his death in Paris aged 82.

References

Notes

References

Bibliography
 
 Bruno de Dinechin, Duhamel du Monceau. Connaissance et mémoires européennes, 1999 
 Une famille d'artistes brestois au XVIIIe siècle – Les Ozanne by Dr Charles Auffret, Hyacinthe Caillière éditeur, Rennes 1891.
Biographie bretonne – Recueil de notices sur tous les Bretons qui se sont fait un nom Vol 2, by Prosper Levot, Cauderan éditeur, Vannes, 1857.

1728 births
1811 deaths
18th-century engravers
French engravers
French male artists
French marine artists
French Navy officers from Brest, France
Sibling artists
Artists from Brest, France